Downtown West is a neighborhood in St. Louis, Missouri. It is, as the name suggests, a section of downtown that is further inland, west from the banks of the Mississippi River. St. Louis City Hall, the Metropolitan Police Headquarters, St. Louis Union Station, Stifel Theatre, Enterprise Center, and the future Centene Stadium are all located in Downtown West. The Washington Avenue Historic District is a former garment district consisting of turn of the previous century high rise warehouses converted into residential lofts, restaurants, taverns, and coffee shops. It is bounded by Jefferson Avenue on the west, Tucker Boulevard on the east, Cole Street on the north, and Chouteau Avenue on the south.

Demographics
In 2020 Downtown West's racial makeup was 46.2% White, 41.0% Black, 0.4% Native American, 4.0% Asian, 6.0% Two or More Races, and 2.3% Some Other Race. 4.8% of the population was of Hispanic or Latino origin.

See also
 City Museum
 Downtown St. Louis
 Gateway Multimodal Transportation Center a train and interstate bus terminal

References

External links 
 downtownstl.org

 
Neighborhoods in St. Louis